Hurricane Gustav was a Category 2 hurricane that paralleled the East Coast of the United States in September 2002 during the 2002 Atlantic hurricane season. It was the seventh named storm and first hurricane of the season. Initially a subtropical depression north of the Bahamas, Gustav passed just to the east of the Outer Banks , North Carolina as a tropical storm before traveling northeastward, making two landfalls in Atlantic Canada as a Category 1 hurricane. The storm was responsible for one death and $100,000 in damage, mostly in North Carolina. The interaction between Gustav and a non-tropical system produced strong winds that caused an additional $240,000 (2002 USD) in damage in New England, but this damage was not directly attributed to the hurricane.

Gustav spent the early part of its existence as a subtropical storm, and was the first such storm to be named from the current lists by the National Hurricane Center. Previously, subtropical storms were not given names. The cyclone was also the latest-forming first hurricane of the season since 1941.

Meteorological history

An area of disturbed weather in association with a weak surface trough and an upper-level trough between the Bahamas and Bermuda developed on September 6. High pressure ridging strengthened by Tropical Storm Fay caused the trough to become more organized and close off into a broad non-tropical low on September 7. By September 8, the system had developed enough convection near its center of circulation to be classified as subtropical depression Eight while located southeast of Cape Hatteras, North Carolina. Later that day, data from a Hurricane Hunter reconnaissance aircraft indicated that the system had strengthened into Subtropical Storm Gustav.

Gustav moved erratically to the west-northwest toward the North Carolina-South Carolina border over the next two days. During this time it slowly strengthened, acquiring more tropical characteristics. On September 10, a poorly organized band of stronger winds developed around the center, and Gustav was designated a fully tropical storm Gustav then began to curve toward the north, brushing Cape Hatteras, before accelerating toward the northeast and away from the coast. On September 11, while under the influence of a non-tropical system over New England, Gustav quickly strengthened into a hurricane. Gustav reached its peak intensity of  later that same day.

By early September 12, the hurricane had begun to slowly weaken and lose tropical characteristics, as it moved over colder waters and encountered increasing wind shear. However, the storm was moving quickly enough to make landfall over Cape Breton, Nova Scotia as a Category 1 hurricane. Later that morning, Gustav made a second landfall in Newfoundland and became extratropical shortly after. The extratropical low continued moving slowly to the northeast before dissipating over the Labrador Sea on September 15.

Preparations

On September 8, forecasters at the National Hurricane Center predicted that Gustav would approach the North Carolina coast, and issued a tropical storm watch from Cape Fear to the North Carolina – Virginia border. The tropical storm watch was upgraded to a tropical storm warning on September 9, and a new tropical storm watch was issued later that day for areas of southeastern Virginia, from the North Carolina – Virginia border to New Point Comfort. The new watch was upgraded to a tropical storm warning on September 10. As Gustav began to turn to the northeast and away from the Mid-Atlantic coast, the tropical storm warnings were gradually discontinued. The last warning was discontinued on September 11.

As Gustav approached Atlantic Canada, Environment Canada and the Canadian Hurricane Centre issued heavy rain and wind warnings for southern New Brunswick, Prince Edward Island, Nova Scotia, and Newfoundland.

Impact

The Carolinas and Virginia

Although the center of Gustav passed just to the east of Cape Hatteras, areas of North Carolina and southeastern Virginia experienced heavy rain and tropical storm force winds. The storm produced storm surges of  along the Outer Banks, and  along the southeastern coast of Virginia. These surges, combined with strong winds and high sea swells, resulted in minor flooding, mainly in Ocracoke and Hatteras Village, North Carolina. A weak waterspout also touched down on Silver Lake near Ocracoke and moved onshore, but only minor roof damage was reported. Sporadic power outages were also reported. One person died at Myrtle Beach, South Carolina after suffering injuries in the high surf, and 40 other people had to be rescued from riptides and storm surges. Damage in North Carolina amounted to $100,000 (2002 USD).

New Jersey
Although the center of Gustav remained well offshore, the difference in pressure between it and a high pressure area located over the central United States, caused strong winds in areas of New Jersey on September 11. The strong winds downed trees and power lines throughout the eastern half of the state, damaging homes and blocking streets. At least 14,000 homes in the vicinity of Burlington and Ocean Counties were left without power. In West Windsor Township, a man was killed when the upper section of a concrete wall he was working on blew over and crushed him. The other death occurred in West Amwell Township, where a tree limb fell on two elderly women, killing one and injuring the other. Elsewhere, while there were reports of trees falling on vehicles, no other serious injuries or deaths were reported.

New York and New England
The interaction between Gustav and the non-tropical system caused strong winds that affected areas of coastal New England, mainly in eastern New York and Massachusetts. The winds downed trees and power lines, and several homes and cars were damaged by fallen trees. Over 29,000 homes were left without power in eastern New York, and 19,000 homes lost power in Massachusetts. In all, the winds caused $240,000 (2002 USD) in damage, but this damage was not directly attributed to Gustav in the National Hurricane Center's analysis.

The winds caused some minor roof damage to buildings, and forced officials in New York City to cordon off parts of Manhattan as debris ranging from wrapping paper to crushed soda cans was blown about. This debris injured four people, one critically, and disrupted a 9/11 memorial service, though it continued as planned.

Damage on the island was mainly limited to downed trees and power lines, although the Long Island Power Authority reported that at least 93,000 homes lost power during the day on September 11. One person was killed when his boat capsized in the Long Island Sound.

Atlantic Canada
Despite gradually losing its tropical characteristics, Gustav brought heavy rain, storm and hurricane-force winds, and storm surges to areas of Atlantic Canada for several days. Several locations set new daily rainfall records. Localized flooding was reported in areas of Prince Edward Island, and 4,000 people in Halifax, Nova Scotia and Charlottetown, Prince Edward Island were left without power. Despite the heavy rain and wind, there were no reports of deaths or significant damage in Atlantic Canada.

Naming and records
Gustav was the first subtropical storm to be given a name from the current name lists by the National Hurricane Center. Prior to the 2002 season, Atlantic subtropical storms were either not named, given a number from a separate numbering list than tropical cyclones, or for a brief period of time, given a name from the  NATO phonetic alphabet.

Normally, an average of three hurricanes form by September 11 of each year. Gustav attained hurricane status on September 11, making it the latest first hurricane to form in any season for 60 years, since the 1941 season, when the first hurricane developed on September 16.

See also

 Tropical cyclone
 Subtropical cyclone
 Other storms of the same name
 List of North Carolina hurricanes (2000–present)
 List of Canada hurricanes

References

Gustav
Gustav (2002)
Gustav (2002)
2002 natural disasters in the United States
Gustav
Gustav